Claudia Josefina Galli Concha (born 3 August 1978) is a Swedish actress. Claudia was born in Stockholm.

Career
She started her career at age three in the segment "Film-tajm" in the television show Trazan & Banarne. Galli got her breakthrough as an actress in the TV4 soap opera Skilda världar where she played the character "Frida Lindberg.

She also played "Lina Svensson" for two seasons of the SVT comedy series Svensson, Svensson she also has been a panel member of the comedy show Parlamentet. Claudia Galli came in second place during Let's Dance 2010 being one of the celebrity dancers being partnered with Tobias Wallin.

After her dance appearances Galli played "Jonna Wetterström" in the SVT comedy series Starke man. From 2012 and forward Galli appeared in the six episode adaptation of author Camilla Läckberg's "Fjällbackamorden" films.

Personal life
Claudia Galli has been married to director Manuel Concha since 2012. She is also the aunt of actress Josephine Bornebusch.

Filmography
 1995 – Svarta skallar och vita nätter
 1997–2002 – Skilda världar 
 1998 – Sista kontraktet
 2001 – Festival
 2001 – Känd från TV
 2006 – Kärringen därnere 
 2006 – Asterix and the viking (voice of Abba)
 2007 –  Tusenbröder 
 2007 – Playa del Sol
 2007 – Lögnens pris
 2007 – Bee Movie (voice of Vanessa Bloome)
 2007 – Harry Potter Potter (voice of Nymphadora Tonks)
 2007–2008 – Svensson Svensson 
 2008 – Misses lista
 2008 – Oskyldigt dömd 
 2009 – Parlamentet
 2009 – Het Huis Anubis (voice of Patricia)
 2009 – Cirkus Möller
 2009 – Emmas film
 2010 – Starke man
 2011 – Rango (voice)
 2011 – Spy Kids 4D (voice of Marissa Wilson)
 2012 – Fjällbackamorden
 2013 – Bäst före

References

1978 births
Living people
21st-century Swedish actresses
Swedish people of Italian descent
Actresses from Stockholm
Actors from Malmö